Bernd Gummelt (born 21 December 1963) is a German former racewalker. He represented the sports club ASK Vorwärts Potsdam. 

Gummelt was born in Neuruppin. He is married to Beate Gummelt (née Anders).

Achievements

References

External Links 

1963 births
Living people
Sportspeople from Neuruppin
People from Bezirk Potsdam
East German male racewalkers
European Athletics Championships medalists
Goodwill Games medalists in athletics
Competitors at the 1990 Goodwill Games